ÍGurnam or Gurnam Singh may refer to:

Gurnam Singh (1899–1973), Chief Minister of Indian Punjab
Gurnam Singh (runner) (born 1931), Indonesian athlete
Gurnam Singh (high jumper) (born 1917), Indian athlete
Gurnam Singh Charuni (born 1959), Indian farm protester
Gurnam Singh death case involving Indian cricketer Navjot Singh Sidhu